
This is a list of bridges documented by the Historic American Engineering Record in the U.S. state of Pennsylvania.

Bridges

See also
List of tunnels documented by the Historic American Engineering Record in Pennsylvania

Notes

References

External links

List
Bridges
Pennsylvania
Bridges
Bridges